Bohuslav Niemiec (Polish: Bogusław Niemiec) (born 11 February 1982) is a Czech politician and deputy chairman of the Christian and Democratic Union – Czechoslovak People's Party (KDU-ČSL) since March 2019. 

He was elected as deputy leader in 2019 Christian and Democratic Union – Czechoslovak People's Party leadership election, nominated as non-Catholic politician and member of the Church of Brethren in the leadership. He is member in communal council of Havířov.

Niemiec belongs to the Polish minority in the Czech Republic and is a member of the Polish Cultural and Educational Union (PZKO).

References 

1981 births
KDU-ČSL politicians
Living people
People from Havířov
Polish people from Zaolzie
Technical University of Ostrava alumni